Charles, Charley, Charlie or Chuck Jordan may refer to:

Arts and entertainment
 Charles Jordan (magician) (1888–1944), American magician
 Charley Jordan (1890–1954), American singer, songwriter, guitarist, and talent scout
 Charles Jordan (baritone) (1915–1986), Canadian singer
 Chuck Jordan (game designer), American video game designer

Politics and law
 Charles Jordan (mayor) (1838–1912), mayor of Tauranga, New Zealand
 Charles Jordan (politician) (1937–2014), American politician in Oregon
 David Charles Jordan (born 1949), Canadian businessman and political figure
 Charles Jordan (government official), American architect and Director of the Office of Transition for the Trust Territory of the Pacific Islands

Science
 Charles Jordan (mathematician) (1871-1959), or Károly Jordan, Hungarian mathematician

Sports
 Charles Jordan (rugby union) (fl. 1880s), Welsh rugby union player
 Charlie Jordan (baseball) (1871–1928), American baseball player
 Charles Jordan (basketball) (born 1954), American basketball player
 Charles Jordan (American football) (born 1969), NFL wide receiver

Others
 Chuck Jordan (automobile designer) (1927–2010), American car designer

Other uses
 Charles A. Jordan House, historic house in Auburn, Maine, USA. 
 Charles E. Jordan High School, located in Durham, North Carolina, USA
 Dr. Charles Jordan House, historic house in Wakefield, Massachusetts, USA
 Charles Jordan Community Center, community center in Portland, Oregon, USA

See also
 Chuck Jordan (disambiguation)
 Charles Jourdan (1883–1976), French fashion designer
 Charles-Étienne Jordan (1700–1745), Prussian-born Huguenot refugee, advisor to Frederick the Great and author